Si Chomphu is the name of several administrative entities in Thailand

Si Chomphu District, Khon Kaen province
, Si Chomphu district, Khon Kaen province
Si Chomphu subdistrict, Phon Charoen district, Bueng Kan province
Si Chomphu subdistrict,  So Phisai district, Bueng Kan province
, Na Kae district, Nakhon Phanom province